Warwick Township may refer to:

Canada
Warwick, Ontario (Warwick Township, Lambton County)

United States
Warwick Township, Benson County, North Dakota
Warwick Township, Tuscarawas County, Ohio
Warwick Township, Bucks County, Pennsylvania
Warwick Township, Chester County, Pennsylvania
Warwick Township, Lancaster County, Pennsylvania

See also
Warwick (disambiguation)